Creston was a provincial electoral district in the Canadian province of British Columbia.  It first appeared on the hustings in the general election of 1924 and its last appearance was in the 1928 election.  Following redistribution, the area was combined with the Nelson riding to create the new (and now current) riding of Nelson-Creston in the 1933 election.

For other current and historical electoral districts in the Kootenay region, please see Kootenay (electoral districts).

Demographics

Political geography

Notable elections

Notable MLAs

Electoral history 
Note:  Winners in each election are in bold.

|- bgcolor="white"
!align="right" colspan=3|Total valid votes
!align="right"|1,759 
!align="right"|100.00%
!align="right"|
|- bgcolor="white"
!align="right" colspan=3|Total rejected ballots
!align="right"|
!align="right"|
!align="right"|
|- bgcolor="white"
!align="right" colspan=3|Turnout
!align="right"|%
!align="right"|
!align="right"|
|}

|- bgcolor="white"
!align="right" colspan=3|Total valid votes
!align="right"|2,162 
!align="right"|100.00%
!align="right"|
|- bgcolor="white"
!align="right" colspan=3|Total rejected ballots
!align="right"|15
!align="right"|
!align="right"|
|- bgcolor="white"
!align="right" colspan=3|Turnout
!align="right"|%
!align="right"|
!align="right"|
|}

The Creston riding was redistributed after the 1928 election.  In the 1933 election the southern Kootenay Lake area was represented by the new riding of Nelson-Creston.

Sources 

Elections BC Historical Returns

Former provincial electoral districts of British Columbia